Nancy Chen is an American television journalist and correspondent with CBS News in New York.

Early life
Nancy Chen was born in Texas and raised in Tulsa, Oklahoma. She attended Oklahoma School of Science and Mathematics, studied Chinese at Peking University in Beijing, and graduated as a Trustee Scholar from the University of Southern California in Los Angeles with a degree in international relations.

Career

Early career
Chen began her career as a print reporter writing for the Tulsa World for three years. During college, she worked as a web producer at KABC-TV in Los Angeles and was involved in production for NBC Sports in Beijing during the 2008 Summer Olympics.

She began her broadcast journalist career at KSBY in San Luis Obispo, California as a multimedia journalist. She subsequently worked for WHDH-TV in Boston, Massachusetts where she covered the 2014 Winter Olympics in Sochi, the 2015 Super Bowl, the 2016 Summer Olympics in Rio de Janeiro, the 2013 EF5 tornado in Moore, Oklahoma, and the Boston Marathon bombing. Chen then joined WJLA-TV in Washington, D.C. in 2017 as a weekday evening anchor. She hosted a reoccurring franchise titled "Hero 24/7" that highlighted volunteers in the Washington, D.C. community. She won two Emmy Awards from the National Capital division of the National Academy of Television Arts and Sciences during her time at WJLA-TV, one of which was for coverage of the 2017 Congressional baseball shooting.

Current

In 2021, Chen joined CBS News as a New York-based correspondent after working as a correspondent with the organization's Newspath division since February of 2020. She has covered national stories including the criminal trial of Kyle Rittenhouse, the Waukesha Christmas parade attack, the 2022 Bronx apartment fire, the Omicron wave in New York City, and the 2022 Buffalo shooting. Her work has been featured on CBS This Morning, CBS Evening News with Norah O'Donnell, CBS Saturday Morning, CBS News Sunday Morning, and Face the Nation. She also fills in as anchor for CBS Saturday Morning and CBSN, CBS' streaming news channel.

In 2022, CBS This Morning won an Emmy Award at the 43rd News and Documentary Emmy Awards for "Outstanding Live News Program" where Chen was listed as a correspondent.

References

Living people
American television journalists
American women television journalists
Year of birth missing (living people)
21st-century American women